Hamlet was an unincorporated community in Raleigh County, West Virginia.

The community was so named on account of its small size.

References 

Unincorporated communities in West Virginia
Unincorporated communities in Raleigh County, West Virginia